Abramites is a genus of headstanders that occurs in South America. Both species swim in a head down position, due to their feeding habits in the wild.

Species
 Abramites eques (Steindachner, 1878)
 Abramites hypselonotus (Günther, 1868) (Marbled headstander)

References

 

Anostomidae
Taxa named by Henry Weed Fowler
Fish of South America